Elmatic is a mixtape by Detroit rapper and former Slum Village member eLZhi. The mixtape is a tribute and a remake of Nas' 1994 classic debut Illmatic. Elmatic was initially released as free download on May 10, 2011, and was later officially released via iTunes on December 20, 2011, with two extra tracks included. The album was acclaimed by critics and praised for its lyrics and production, many publishers and websites have named it on their top list of the year.

The music

Track listing

References

Elzhi albums
Fat Beats Records albums
2011 mixtape albums